The Arundell family of Cornwall are amongst the few Cornish families of Norman origin, and there are still fewer of French extraction who have for so long a period (at least five or six centuries) been, like them, traceable in that county.

Lanherne
The Arundells of Lanherne — "the Great Arundells" as they were styled — appear to have settled in Cornwall, about the middle of the thirteenth century, at the place so called (now the site of a nunnery), situated on the western slope of a wooded valley, lying between St Columb Major and the sea; or possibly before that time at a place in the adjoining parish of St Ervan, named Trembleath (Journal of the Royal Institution of Cornwall, September 1876, pp. 285–93). The presence of Ardundell's family in England is dated back to eleventh century, at the time of William the Conqueror. A very early member of the family, Roger, was marshal of England; and according to the Exeter Cathedral 'Martyrologium,' William de Arundell, who died in 1246, was a canon of that cathedral; about the same time a Roger Arundell lived opposite St. Stephen's church in that city. In 1260 a Sir Ralph Arundell was sheriff of Cornwall; and a few years later we find a John Arundell holding lands at Efford, near Bude, and other Arundells were landowners in the eastern part of the county. Of the Sir John Arundell, the story of whose expedition against the Duke of Brittany in 1379 is recorded by the chroniclers, a separate and fuller account is given below.

His grandson, Sir John Arundell, The Magnificent,  was a great church benefactor (notably to the celebrated lost church of St. Piran-in-the-Sands — Perranzabulæ), and, according to his will, dated 18 April 1433, possessed no less than fifty-two complete suits of cloth of gold. He was a naval commander, and was sheriff of Cornwall four times, and M.P. for the county in 1422-3. The Arundells intermarried with most of the old Cornish families — nearly all of them now extinct — thus adding considerably to their vast possessions, until at length, in the twenty-ninth year of Henry VI, John Arundell, born about 1421, had become the largest free tenant in Cornwall, his estates being of the value of 2,000l. per annum. He was sheriff and admiral of Cornwall, and a general for Henry VI in his French wars, but was attainted in 1483.

The Arundells acquired Lanherne by marriage with the heiress of that family; and they also formed, at different periods, alliances with the Carminows, the Grenvilles, the Bevils, the Lambournes, the Carews, the Trevanions, the Erisys, and other Cornish families. Another John Arundell was bishop of Exeter (1502-4); and of him too, as well as of another member of the Lanherne family, who became bishop of Chichester in 1458, fuller accounts will appear below. A grandson of the above-named admiral — also a Sir John Arundell — was made knight-banneret on the field of Therouenne, died in 1545, and was buried in the church of St Mary Woolnoth, Lombard Street. He was the father of the erudite Mary Arundell.

Another Sir John Arundell, who died in 1589 — or, according to the Isleworth Register (Oliver's Collections), in 1591 — at Isleworth, was converted to Catholicism, as Dodd tells us in his 'Church History,' by Father Cornelius (a native of the neighbouring town of Bodmin). In defence of Cornelius Sir John Arundell lost his own liberty, and was confined for nine years in Ely Palace, Holborn (cf. Morris's Troubles of our Catholic Forefathers, 1875; Simpson's Edmund Campion, 1867; and Challoner's Memoirs of Missionary Priests, 1803). The next prominent members of the Lanherne family are Sir Thomas (d.1552) and Humphry Arundell (1513-1549-50), of both of whom accounts are given below. From Sir John Arundell, the knight-banneret of Therouenne, descended the Arundells of Wardour Castle; and by the marriage of Lady Mary Bellings-Arundell, in 1739, to Henry, seventh Baron Arundell of Wardour, the Lanherne and Wardour branches of the family were, after a separation of more than two centuries, reunited.

Trerice
The Arundells of Trerice were seated in the parish of Newlyn East, about five miles south of Lanherne; and some fine portions remain of their mansion of the sixteenth century. At an early period they had another residence at Allerford in West Somerset, but they were seated at Trerice at least as early as the reign of Edward III. At first they bore different arms from the Lanherne Arundells, apparently owing to a difference of opinion as to which was the elder branch; but ultimately they adopted the same, viz. sable, six swallows argent. However this may be, 'precisely to rip up the whole pedigree,' as Richard Carew, the Cornish historian, who married into the Tolverne branch of the family, observes, 'were more tedious than behooveful.' The earliest Trerice Arundell of note seems to have been a Sir John, vice-admiral of Cornwall early in the fifteenth century. When sheriff of Cornwall he was sent by King Edward IV to retake St. Michael's Mount, which had been seized by the Earl of Oxford. Sir John had removed from Efford, by the seaside, to Trerice (an inland abode), owing, it is said, to a prophecy (Hals) that 'he would be slain in the sands.' Yet he did not avert his fate; for, on the strand near Marazion, he lost his life in 1471 in a skirmish; and his remains lie in the chapel of St Michael's Mount.

The Arundells of Trerice evidently continued in royal favour, for one of them received an autograph letter from the queen of Henry VII, announcing to him the birth of a prince, her son. Henry VIII appointed another Sir John Arundell (grand-nephew of him who was killed at the Mount) his esquire of the body. He was known as 'Jack of Tilbury.' He is noticed below, as well as his grandson, 'John Game to the Toes' — 'John for the King' — and his great-grandson, Richard Arundell, first Baron Arundell of Trerice. Carew is full of information as to this branch of the family. The male line of the family became extinct by the death of the fourth baron, John, in 1768; and Trerice ultimately passed into the hands of Sir Thomas Dyke Acland, Bart. An uncle of the last baron, the Hon. Richard Arundell, who died in 1759 without issue, was M.P. for Knaresborough, clerk of the pipe, surveyor of works, master and warden of the mint, and a commissioner of the treasury. Amongst the legal representatives of the Arundells of Trerice in 1829, was Ada Byron, daughter of the poet.

Tolverne
The Arundells of Tolverne were seated at a very early date at the place on the left bank of the Fal which gives them their distinctive name; but no trace remains of their abode. They seem to have separated from the main stem of Lanherne at an earlier date than the Arundells of Trerice, and to have settled at Tolverne in the reign of Edward I, in consequence of Sir John Arundell of Trembleath (son of Sir Ralph Arundell of Lanherne, who was sheriff of Cornwall in 1260) marrying Joan le Soor of Tolverne. Sir Thomas Arundell, who died in 1443, is another of the early Arundells who appears upon the scene. Like the Arundells of Lanherne and Trerice, the Arundells of Tolverne intermarried with good Cornish blood, but this branch chose generally the western families for their alliances, such as Reskymer, Trefusis, St. Aubyn, Godolphin, and Trelawny. The grandson of Thomas Arundell, who died in 1552 (who was also called Thomas, and who was knighted by James I), having seriously impaired his fortune by endeavouring to discover an imaginary island in America, called 'Old Brazil,' sold Tolverne, and afterwards lived at Truthall in the parish of Sithney. John Arundell, son of Sir Thomas, one of the Truthall Arundells, was a colonel of horse for Charles II, and a deputy governor of Pendennis Castle, in 1665, under his relative Richard, Baron Arundell of Trerice; he died in 1671.

Of the Minor Arundells, the branch which settled at Menadarva, in the parish of lllogan, appears to have been founded by one Robert Arundell, a natural son of 'Jack of Tilbury.' Hals has, as usual, some odd gossip about him. One of his descendants, Francis Arundell of Trengwainton near Penzance, was born about the year 1620, and died in 1697. He followed that unusual course amongst the Cornish gentry of taking up arms for the parliament, holding the rank of captain. The Arundells sold Menadarva in 1755 to the Bassets of Tehidy.

Another branch settled at Trevithick, about two miles west of St. Columb Major. Various others of the minor Arundells appear from time to time (but fallen from their high estate) in the church registers in the eastern part of Cornwall: one of the line, William, more than two centuries ago, married Dorothy, a descendant of that Theodoro Palæologus who was buried at Landulph in 1637. She is described in the parish register as being 'ex stirpe imperatorum;' so that there probably still flows in the veins of many a rustic in the neighbourhood of Callington and Saltash the mingled blood of those Arundells who came over to England with the Conqueror, and that of the Byzantine emperors of the East.

Notable people

Anne Arundell
John Arundel (bishop of Exeter)
John Arundell (born 1576)
John Arundell (admiral) and Sheriff of Cornwall
John Arundell (of Trerice, died 1580)
John Arundell (1366–1435)
John Arundell (1392–1423)
John Arundell (1421–1473)
Lady Blanche Arundell
Baron Arundell of Trerice
Charles Arundell
Charles Calvert, 3rd Baron Baltimore
Cicely Compton, Lady Arundell of Wardour
Humphrey Arundell
James Arundell, 10th Baron Arundell of Wardour
John Arundell, 16th Baron Arundell of Wardour
John Arundell, 2nd Baron Arundell of Trerice
Mary Arundell (courtier)
Matthew Arundell
Richard Bellings (courtier)
Richard Arundell
Richard Arundell, 1st Baron Arundell of Trerice
Thomas Arundell, 1st Baron Arundell of Wardour
Thomas Arundell, 2nd Baron Arundell of Wardour
Thomas Arundell of Wardour Castle
Thomas Arundell (of Duloe)
Francis Tregian the Elder

See also 

 Anne Arundel County, Maryland, named after the eponymous family

References

Attribution

 
English families
Cornish families